Hypseochloa is a genus of African plants in the grass family.

 Species
 Hypseochloa cameroonensis C.E. Hubb. – southern Nigeria, Cameroon, Tanzania
 Hypseochloa matengoensis C.E. Hubb. – Matengo Highlands in Songea District of western Tanzania

References

 
Grasses of Africa
Poaceae genera
Taxa named by Charles Edward Hubbard
Taxonomy articles created by Polbot